Trịnh is a Vietnamese family name. It exists in equivalent forms in other languages such as the Korean (Jeong, Chung) and Chinese (Zheng, Cheng). 

Families that bear the surname Trịnh are exclusively Vietnamese. The surname further proliferated following the reign of the House of Trịnh in Tonkin.

Notable people 
Trịnh lords, A noble feudal clan that wielded de facto power in Northern Vietnam between the 16th-18th centuries. Opposed the Nguyễn lords of Southern Vietnam through a series of civil wars.
Trịnh Như Khuê, First Cardinal of the Catholic Church of Vietnam, Archbishop of Archdiocese of Hanoi
Trịnh Văn Căn, Second Cardinal of Catholic Church of Vietnam, Archbishop of Archdiocese of Hanoi
Eugene Huu Chau Trinh, the first Vietnamese-American astronaut
Trinh Xuan Thuan, Big Bang theorist/scientist
Trịnh Công Sơn, Vietnamese musician
Trinh T. Minh-ha, filmmaker
François Trinh-Duc, French rugby union player of Vietnamese descent
Trang Trịnh, Vietnamese pianist

See also 
Jeong (surname)
Zheng (surname)

Vietnamese-language surnames